UpLink is an open, digital crowd-engagement platform, created to foster mass participation to meet the United Nations' 17 global Sustainable Development Goals (SDGs) in their 2030 Agenda. It is a collaboration platform created in partnership with Deloitte, Microsoft and Salesforce.

UpLink will be available to everyone and allow users to register and sign up to comment and contribute to different SDGs by responding on the different goals. Users responses will help provide new views on the different various goals to actual decision makers and leaders around the world. The World Economic Forum (WEF) will oversee the online networking platform.

History 
At the United Nation's (U.N.) yearly summit in 2015, world leaders gathered came together to adopt a 2030 Agenda for what the U.N. calls Sustainable Development Goals. These goals are meant to guide U.N. member states on how to face seventeen different core issues currently affecting humanity. On 18 January 2018, the World Economic Forum and International Finance Corporation (IFC) announced that they were to select fifty regional start-ups in Latin America to take part in the creation of the UpLink initiative meant to tackle these core issues.

At the annual WEF event on 25 September 2019, it was announced publicly in New York that UpLink will be launched in January 2020 with the first SDG issue being tackled is "ocean" and water-related issues, also known as SDG 14. The remaining 16 SDGs will have other platforms set to be released in lieu with UpLink by beginning 2021. It is unknown whether these platforms will be separate or converged under the UpLink initiative.

The World Economic Forum has since pushed back the first publicly available release date of the platform to March 2020.

See also 
 Crowdsourcing
 Internet culture

References

External links 

 

Promotion and marketing communications
United Nations Environment Programme
Crowdsourcing